The All India Ulama & Mashaikh Board (AIUMB)
has been established with the basic purpose of popularizing the message of peace of Islam and ensuring peace for the country and community and the humanity. AIUMB is striving to propagate Sunni Sufi culture globally. Mosques, Dargahs, Aastanas, and Khanqwahs are such fountainheads of spirituality where worship of God is supplemented with worldly duties of propagating peace, amity, brotherhood and tolerance.

AIUMB is a product of a necessity felt in the spiritual, ethical and social thought process of Khaqwahs. Khanqwahs also have made up their mind to update the process and change with the changing times. As it is a fact that Khanqwahs can not ignore some of the pressing problems of the community so the necessity to change the work culture of these centers of preaching and learning and healing was felt strongly. AIUMB condemns all those deeds and words that destabilize the country as it is well known that this religion of peace never preaches hatred. Islam is for peace. Security for all is the real call. AIUMB condemns violence in all its form and manifestation and always ready to heal the wounds of all the mauled and oppressed human beings. The integral part of the manifesto of AIUMB is peace and development. And that is why Board gives first priority to establish centers of quality modern education in Sunni Sufi dominated areas of the country. The other significant objectives of the Board are protection of waqf properties, development of Mosques, Aastanas, Dargahs and Khanqwahs.

This Board is also active in securing workable reservation for Muslims in education and employment in proportion to their population. For this they have been organizing meetings in U.P, Rajasthan, Gujrat, Delhi, Bihar, West Bengal, Jharkhand, Chattisgadh, Jammu and Kashmir, and other states besides huge Sunni Sufi conferences and Muslim Maha Panchayets. Sunni conference (Muradabad 3rd Jan 2011), Bhagalpur (10th May 2010) and Muslim Maha Panchayet at Pakbara Muradabad (16th October 2011) and also Mashaikh e tareeqat conference of Bareilly (26th November 2011), World Sufi Forum (16-20 March 2016), Sufi Conference at West Bengal (February 2019), Sufi Conference at Kashmir (September 2021) are some of the examples.

National Executive Body

World Sufi Forum
All India Ulema and Mashaikh Board organised World Sufi forum in New Delhi from 17 to 20 March 2016. It was a gathering of 200 delegates from all around the world who were to denounce the terrorism and extremism. Famous Muslim Sufi scholar Shaykh ul Islam Dr. Muhammad Tahir-ul-Qadri delivered a keynote speech on 20 March 2016 in Ramlila Ground New Delhi, where he condemned terrorism and suicide bombings.

See also
Karwan-I-Islami

References

External links 

 

  

Sufi organizations
Sunni organizations
Islamic organisations based in India
Sunni Islam in India
Member organizations of the Sunni Students Council